Pierre Lacroix (born April 11, 1959) is a Canadian former professional ice hockey defenceman who played 274 National Hockey League games for the Quebec Nordiques and the Hartford Whalers. He is the father of Maxime Lacroix. As a youth, he played in the 1971 Quebec International Pee-Wee Hockey Tournament with a minor ice hockey team from Sainte-Foy.

Career statistics

References

External links

1959 births
Living people
EHC Arosa players
Diables Noirs de Tours players
Fredericton Express players
HC Fribourg-Gottéron players
Hartford Whalers players
Ours de Villard-de-Lans players
Quebec Nordiques draft picks
Quebec Nordiques players
Quebec Remparts players
People from Sainte-Foy, Quebec City
Trois-Rivières Draveurs players
Viry-Châtillon EH players
Ice hockey people from Quebec City
Canadian ice hockey defencemen